Atticus is a British/Canadian anonymous poet who resides in Venice Beach, California. His books, The Dark Between Stars and The Truth About Magic, became New York Times Best Sellers. He writes poems incorporating themes of love, relationships, and adventure.

Atticus made a choice to remain anonymous after losing a friend to an overdose in Vancouver, British Columbia.

Atticus cites a wide array of artists and writers as influences, including numerous poets, musicians, and public figures from the mid-twentieth century, such as Jack Kerouac, Ernest Hemingway, Mary Oliver, F. Scott Fitzgerald, Monet, Bob Dylan, Robert Frost, Chet Baker, and Steve McQueen.

Personal life 

Atticus began sharing poetry online in 2013 after becoming friends with Michael Madsen.

Atticus works with the nonprofit To Write Love On Her Arms in support of mental health services and awareness for youth.

Atticus employees the spouses of armed forces using placement services like SquaredAway.

Career 

He wears a mask during readings and book signings as a symbol of spreading art with fame.

Karlie Kloss, Alicia Keys, Emma Roberts, The Chainsmokers, Maroon 5, Rachel Bilson, and Cody Simpson have quoted his works.

Influences 

Atticus cites his inspiration from his favorite writers: Walt Whitman, Charles Bukowski, Jack Kerouac, Sylvia Plath, and Maya Angelou.

Publications 

The Dark Between Stars is a New York Times bestseller. It has been translated into 14 languages, including German, Spanish, French, Italian, and Portuguese.

The Truth About Magic was released on September 10, 2019.

Love Her Wild is a national and international bestselling book. It has been translated into 14 languages including German, Spanish, French, Italian, Portuguese.

LVOE: Poems, Epigrams & Aphorisms was released on November 1, 2022. It was an Amazon bestseller and Instant National Bestseller.

Awards and recognition 

In 2016 Atticus was named the #1 Poet To Follow by Teen Vogue.

In 2022 Atticus was named "The World's most Tattooable Poet" by Galore Magazine.

References 

Canadian male poets
21st-century Canadian male writers
21st-century Canadian poets
Instagram poets
21st-century pseudonymous writers